Grigol Liluashvili (born 1 September 1977) is a Georgian politician and civil servant, who is currently serving as the Chief of the State Security Service.

Career

Liluashvili entered politics from the business sector as an associate of former Prime Minister and billionaire businessman Bidzina Ivanishvili. In 2016 he was elected as a member of parliament from the Georgian Dream party, however he was quickly transferred to a senior position in the State Security Service. After the appointment of Vakhtang Gomelauri as the Minister of Internal Affairs, Liluashvili was named the Head of the Security Service.

Notes

21st-century politicians from Georgia (country)
Government officials from Georgia (country)
1977 births
Living people